Emma Carrick-Anderson (born 17 June 1975) is a Scottish former alpine skier who competed for Great Britain at the Winter Olympic Games in 1992, 1994, 1998 and 2002.

Skiing career 
Originally from Dunblane, Carrick-Anderson began skiing at the age of two and was racing by the age of six; she spent four years attending the Austrian Ski School in Schladming. In 1992, she was named as the Scottish Skier of the Year.

Carrick-Anderson made her debut at the 1992 Winter Olympics at the age of sixteen. She competed in four Olympics, six World Championships, and numerous World Cups l.

Post-Skiing 
She announced her retirement in 2003, stating that while she remained motivated she was "fed up with living out of a suitcase." She had also found it difficult to adapt to the new skis that came into use for competition.

Following her retirement, she relocated to the French Alps to work as a ski instructor, and has done commentary work for Eurosport and the BBC.

Personal life 
Her elder brother Crawford was also a skier, but achieved success as a mountain bike racer.

Carrick-Anderson married Phil Smith, a fellow skier, in 2004. The couple have three sons, all of whom have followed in their parents' footsteps as keen competitive skiers.

References

1975 births
Living people
Sportspeople from Dunblane
Scottish expatriate sportspeople in Austria
Olympic alpine skiers of Great Britain
Alpine skiers at the 1992 Winter Olympics
Alpine skiers at the 1994 Winter Olympics
Alpine skiers at the 1998 Winter Olympics
Alpine skiers at the 2002 Winter Olympics
Skiing announcers
Skiing coaches
Scottish female alpine skiers
Scottish emigrants to France